Descendre is the ninth album by Norwegian jazz guitarist Terje Rypdal recorded in 1979 and released on the ECM label.

Reception
The Allmusic review by Michael P. Dawson awarded the album 4 stars stating "The unusual trio form of guitar, trumpet, and drums makes for some gorgeous floating sounds".

Track listing
All compositions by Terje Rypdal
 "Avskjed" - 5:44   
 "Circles" - 11:15   
 "Descendre" - 3:11   
 "Innseiling" - 7:57   
 "Men of Mystery" - 8:25   
 "Speil" - 8:25  
Recorded at Talent Studio in Oslo, Norway in March 1979

Personnel
Terje Rypdal — electric guitar, keyboards, flute
Palle Mikkelborg — trumpet, flugelhorn, keyboards
Jon Christensen — drums, percussion

References

ECM Records albums
Terje Rypdal albums
1980 albums
Albums produced by Manfred Eicher